Newburgh Colored Burial Ground is a historic cemetery and national historic district located at Newburgh in Orange County, New York. It consists of an archaeological site for a 19th-century burial ground containing approximately 100 graves located on the west and northwest sides of the Newburgh City Courthouse, possibly extending under adjacent Robinson Avenue. The cemetery was active between about 1832 and 1867.

It was listed on the National Register of Historic Places in 2010.

References

Cemeteries on the National Register of Historic Places in New York (state)
Archaeological sites on the National Register of Historic Places in New York (state)
Historic districts on the National Register of Historic Places in New York (state)
Cemeteries in Orange County, New York
National Register of Historic Places in Orange County, New York
Buildings and structures in Newburgh, New York
African-American cemeteries in New York (state)